Ruagea is a genus of plants in the family Meliaceae. It contains the following species (but this list may be incomplete):
 Ruagea membranacea W. Palacios
 Ruagea microphylla W. Palacios
 Ruagea ovalis (Rusby) Harms

 
Meliaceae genera
Taxonomy articles created by Polbot